Miguel de la Fuente Escudero (born 3 September 1999), sometimes known as Miguelín or simply Miguel, is a Spanish footballer who plays as a forward for Deportivo Alavés.

Club career
Born in Tudela de Duero, Valladolid, Castile and León, Miguel joined Real Valladolid's youth setup in 2013, aged 13. On 26 March 2017, aged just 17, he made his senior debut with the reserves by starting in a 0–0 away draw against Burgos CF in the Segunda División B.

On 20 November 2017, Miguel renewed his contract until 2021. Six days later he scored his first senior goal, netting the equalizer for the B-team in a 1–1 draw at Pontevedra CF.

On 21 October 2018, Miguel made his first-team – and La Liga – debut, coming on as a late substitute for Enes Ünal in a 1–0 away defeat of Real Betis. On 1 October 2020, he was loaned to Segunda División side CD Leganés for one year.

Miguel scored his first professional goal on 11 April 2021, netting the equalizer in a 1–2 away loss against RCD Espanyol. On 16 May, he scored a brace in a 3–0 home success over UD Logroñés.

On 23 August 2021, free agent Miguel signed a four-year contract with Deportivo Alavés of the top tier. He scored his first goal in the top tier on 11 May of the following year, netting the opener in a 2–1 home win over Espanyol.

Career statistics

Club

References

External links

1999 births
Living people
Sportspeople from the Province of Valladolid
Spanish footballers
Footballers from Castile and León
Association football forwards
La Liga players
Segunda División players
Segunda División B players
Real Valladolid Promesas players
Real Valladolid players
CD Leganés players
Deportivo Alavés players
Spain youth international footballers